Pheia haematosticta is a moth in the subfamily Arctiinae. It was described by E. Dukinfield Jones in 1908. It is found in Paraná, Brazil.

References

Moths described in 1908
haematosticta